The president of Czechoslovakia was the head of state of  Czechoslovakia, from the creation of the First Czechoslovak Republic in 1918 until the dissolution of the Czech and Slovak Federative Republic on 1 January 1993.

In periods when the presidency was vacant, most presidential duties were assumed by the prime minister.

The second section lists the leaders of the Communist Party of Czechoslovakia (KSČ) from 1948 to 1989. The post was titled as Chairman from 1948 to 1953, First Secretary from 1953 to 1971, and General Secretary from 1971 to 1989. After the 1948 coup d'état, the KSČ's leader was the country's de facto chief executive. However, three party leaders (Klement Gottwald, Antonín Novotný and Gustáv Husák) also served as president at some point in their tenures.

Presidents of Czechoslovakia (1918–1992)
Political parties

Other factions

General secretaries of the Communist Party of Czechoslovakia (1948–1989)

Except for the final office-holder, the leader of the KSČ was de facto the most powerful person in the country during this period.

Title: Chairman (1948–1953) and First Secretary (1953–1971).

Timeline

Presidential standards

See also

 List of rulers of Czechs
 List of Bohemian monarchs
 List of rulers of the Protectorate of Bohemia and Moravia
 List of prime ministers of Czechoslovakia
 President of the Czech Republic
 List of presidents of the Czech Republic
 Prime Minister of the Czech Republic
 List of prime ministers of the Czech Republic
 President of Slovakia
 Prime Minister of Slovakia

References

Czechoslovakia
Lists of political office-holders in Czechoslovakia
 
 
Presidents
Presidents